Freemason Lodge Stables is the training yard of Sir Michael Stoute, ten-time British flat racing Champion Trainer.

It is located next to the prestigious Bury Road in Newmarket, Suffolk.

References

Racing stables in Newmarket